Bahrain Radio and Television Corporation (BRTC) is a public broadcaster in Bahrain with headquarters in Manama. The BRTC is owned by the government of Bahrain, and under the control of the Information Affairs Authority.

History
BRTC was set up in 1971, and became an independent body in January 1993. The corporation regulates visual and audio broadcasting in the Kingdom of Bahrain. It broadcasts programs in both Arabic and English.

Radio Bahrain

Radio Bahrain was established in 1955, was taken over by BRTC in 1971, and became an independent body in 1993. Its English-language radio service has been on-air since 1977, broadcasting four hours a day from a studio in Isa Town. In 1982 the station was moved to a building in Adliya. On-air time was extended to 18 hours a day. A second station, Radio 2, began broadcasting 6 hours a day. In 1989 a new studio was established in the Ministry of Information building, and the following year the station went 24 hours. In 2007 Radio Bahrain switched its frequency from 101.0FM to 99.5FM.

Bahrain TV

Bahrain TV was formed in 1973 and has produced many Bahraini-created and produced shows, the most prominent being youth shows such as Chat with Batelco, and Hala Bahrain. Bahrain TV was criticised for the way it handled the 2011 Bahrain uprising, during which it ran a campaign to name, punish and shame those who took part in the uprising.

Programs

Current

Imported shows

Animated shows
 The Pink Panther

Former

Imported shows

Animated shows
 The Adventures of Blinky Bill
 The Adventures of Dawdle the Donkey
 The Adventures of Hutch the Honeybee
 The Adventures of Marco & Gina
 Adventures of Pow Wow
 Adventures of Sonic the Hedgehog
 Aladdin
 The Animals of Farthing Wood
 Animaniacs
 Animated Classics
 Arthur
 Atom Ant
 Babar
 The Baby Huey Show
 Batman: The Animated Series
 Beast Wars: Transformers
 Billy the Cat
 Blazing Dragons
 Bob the Builder
 Budgie the Little Helicopter
 Cadillacs and Dinosaurs
 Captain Planet and the Planeteers
 Captain Simian and the Space Monkeys
 Casper the Friendly Ghost
 Crocadoo
 Dennis and Gnasher
 Dog City
 Double Dragon
 Dragon Tales
 DuckTales
 Ferdy the Ant
 Flash Gordon
 Gargoyles
 Goof Troop
 G.I. Joe
 Heathcliff and the Catillac Cats
 Hey Arnold!
 The Hot Rod Dogs and Cool Car Cats
 Laurel and Hardy
 Looney Tunes/Merrie Melodies
 The Magic School Bus
 Mighty Ducks: The Animated Series
 Mortal Kombat: Defenders of the Realm
 The Mozart Band
 Mr. Bogus
 The New Adventures of Jonny Quest
 Noddy's Toyland Adventures
 Oscar and Friends
 Pinky and the Brain
 Popeye the Sailor Man
 Postman Pat
 The Prince of Atlantis
 The Raggy Dolls
 ReBoot
 Renada
 Road Rovers
 Rugrats
 Rupert
 Salty's Lighthouse
 The Secret Lives of Waldo Kitty
 Street Sharks
 SWAT Kats: The Radical Squadron
 Teo
 Tiny Toon Adventures
 The Transformers
 Voltron
 Widget
 X-Men: Evolution

Documentary
 Big Cat Diary
 Deadly Australians
 Insectia
 Pioneers of Egyptology
 Wonders of Weather

Game shows
 The Crystal Maze
 Wheel of Fortune

Children
 The Adventures of Shirley Holmes
 The Adventures of the Aftermath Crew
 Alphabet Castle
 Animal Tales
 Art Attack
 At the Zoo
 Bananas in Pyjamas
 Barney & Friends
 Bear in the Big Blue House
 Big Bag
 Blue's Clues
 Brum
 Camp Wilderness
 Don't Blame the Koalas
 Finger Tips
 Fudge
 Ghostwriter
 Glad Rags
 Goosebumps
 Groundling Marsh
 Huckleberry Finn and His Friends
 Jay Jay the Jet Plane
 Lift Off
 Lizzie McGuire
 The Mechanical Universe
 Mentors
 Mirror, Mirror
 Mowgli: The New Adventures of the Jungle Book
 My Best Friend is an Alien
 My Secret Identity
 The New Ghostwriter Mysteries
 Ocean Girl
 Secret Life of Toys
 The Secret World of Alex Mack
 Sesame Street
 Spellbinder: Land of the Dragon Lord
 So You Want to Be
 Theodore Tugboat
 Thomas The Tank Engine & Friends
 The Wayne Manifesto
 The Wonderful World of Brother Buzz

Comedy
 3rd Rock from the Sun
 ALF
 America's Funniest Home Videos
 Beadle's About
 Boy Meets World
 Café Americain
 Candid Camera
 Coach
 Dad's Army
 Everybody Loves Raymond
 Family Matters
 Family Ties
 Fay
 The Fresh Prince of Bel-Air
 Friends
 The Golden Girls
 Good Time Harry
 The Gregory Hines Show
 Growing Pains
 The Hogan Family
 The Jeff Foxworthy Show
 Joey
 Just for Laughs: Gags
 King of Queens
 Mad About You
 Mind Your Language
 A Sharp Intake of Breath
 Sledge Hammer!
 Smart Guy
 Spin City

Cooking
 Bake with Anna Olson
 Huey's Cooking Adventures

Drama
 The Adventures of Sinbad
 The Adventures of Swiss Family Robinson
 Airwolf
 Automan
 The A-Team
 Buffalo Girls
 Buffy, the Vampire Slayer
 Dickens of London
 Doctor Who
 Dr. Quinn, Medicine Woman
 Due South
 A Family at War
 Fast Track
 Hercules: The Legendary Journeys
 Hill Street Blues
 Katts and Dog
 Knight Rider
 The Legend of William Tell
 Lois & Clark: The New Adventures of Superman
 Manimal
 Martial Law
 Moloney
 Moonlighting
 M.A.N.T.I.S.
 New York Undercover
 Perry Mason
 Pit Pony
 Police Rescue
 Pride and Prejudice
 The Rockford Files
 Simon & Simon
 Sirens
 The Six Billion Dollar Man
 Sliders
 The Sopranos
 Star Trek: The Next Generation
 Street Hawk
 Superboy
 Team Knight Rider
 Viper
 Walker, Texas Ranger
 Water Rats
 Wildside
 Xena: Warrior Princess
 The X-Files
 Zorro

Wrestling
 WWF Superstars of Wrestling

Sports
 Trans World Sport

Horror
 Werewolf

Magazine
 Cybernet
 Martha Stewart Living

Reality
 Healthy, Wealthy and Wise
 Man vs. Wild

Education
 Beyond 2000

Western
 The Adventures of Brisco County, Jr.

Soap Opera
 The Colbys
 Dallas
 Falcon Crest

Talk Shows
 The Oprah Winfrey Show

See also
 Media in Bahrain
 Information Affairs Authority

References

Mass media companies established in 1971
Publicly funded broadcasters
Mass media in Manama
State media
Mass media companies of Bahrain
Companies based in Manama
Bahraini companies established in 1971